Civil clause (German: Zivilklausel), sometimes civilian clause or  civilians' clause is a voluntary commitment by academic institutions to engage exclusively in civil (i.e. non-military) research.

The idea originates in Japan: In 1950, the Science Council of Japan established 
that its members will refuse to participate in military-related research projects.
Such a declaration was repeated in 1967, and in 2017.

In Germany, Universität Bremen was the first to put a Civil Clause in effect.
Its resolution no.5113 from 1986 declared:

This declaration has been renewed in 1992 and in 2020

Since then, many German universities have followed this example.

 Technische Universität Darmstadt requires:

 TU Berlin's academic senate decided in 1991:

 Eberhard Karls Universität Tübingen amended its constitution in 2010 as follows:

 Georg-August-Universität Göttingen on February 13 (2013) supplemented the following Civil Clause to its mission statement:

Civil Clauses can be regarded as contemporary extensions of Merton's norms on scientific ethos.

List of German Universities with Civil Clauses 
 Technische Universität Berlin
 Universität Bremen
 Universität Konstanz
 Technische Universität Dortmund
 Carl von Ossietzky Universität Oldenburg
 Christian-Albrechts-Universität zu Kiel
 Technische Universität Ilmenau
 Eberhard Karls Universität Tübingen
 Universität Rostock
 Technische Universität Darmstadt
 Georg-August-Universität Göttingen
 Johann Wolfgang Goethe-Universität Frankfurt am Main
 Westfälische Wilhelms-Universität Münster
 Universität Kassel
 Albert-Ludwigs-Universität Freiburg

External links 
 German Initiative for Civil Clauses
 Zivilklausel Universität Köln
 Military use of research pushback in Japan and South Korea

References 

Peace and conflict studies
Arms control